Nalu may refer to:

Organisations
 National Army for the Liberation of Uganda
 National Amalgamated Labourers' Union, a trade union in the UK active from 1889 to 1921
 National Agricultural Labourers' Union, a trade union in the UK active from 1872 to 1896

Other uses
 Nalu (drink)
 Nalu people, West Africa
 Nalu language, spoken by the Nalu people
 Nalu at Fulham Correctional Centre, a prison unit in Australia
 Nalu River (纳噜水): another name for the Liao River in China
 Prince Nalu, a character in Barbie: Fairytopia and Barbie: Mermaidia

See also
 Naluo language (Yunnan, China)
 Nalus, a city in Iran

Language and nationality disambiguation pages